Sarkar is a 2005 Indian Hindi-language political crime thriller film directed by Ram Gopal Varma. The film stars Amitabh Bachchan in the title role alongside Abhishek Bachchan as his younger son, along with Kay Kay Menon, Katrina Kaif, Tanisha Mukherjee, Supriya Pathak, Kota Srinivasa Rao, and Anupam Kher. It is the first installment of the Sarkar film series.

Sarkar spawned two sequels: Sarkar Raj, which released on 6 June 2008, and Sarkar 3, which released on 12 May 2017. Sarkar was premiered at the New York Asian Film Festival. The film is preserved at the American Academy of Motion Pictures library.

Plot
Subhash Nagre, who is known by his followers as Sarkar, lives in Mumbai. The opening scenes show a rape victim's father approaching Sarkar for justice (which the corrupt law and order system has failed to deliver), which Sarkar promptly establishes by having the rapist beaten up by his henchmen. His son Vishnu plays a sleazy producer who is more interested in the film actress Sapna than his wife Amrita. Sarkar's other, more upright son Shankar returns from the United States with his love Pooja after completing his education there. Pooja's doubts about Sarkar's image eventually cause Shankar, who firmly believes in his father's righteousness, to break up with her.

One day, a Dubai-based don, Rasheed, tries to strike a deal with Sarkar; he promptly refuses on moral grounds and also forbids him from doing it himself. Rasheed tries to eliminate Sarkar's supremacy with the help of Selvar Mani, Sarkar's former associate, MLA Vishram Bhagat, and Swami Virendra. Meanwhile, they trap Sarkar by assassinating a righteous, upright, Ahinsa political leader and an outspoken critic of Sarkar, Motilal Khurana, and frame Sarkar for the murder. Everyone, including Vishnu, believes that Sarkar is guilty, but Shankar has deep faith in his father. Sarkar is arrested and imprisoned. Shankar now takes over the position of Sarkar temporarily. On learning of a plot to murder his father in prison, he approaches the police commissioner and asks him to arrange stronger security for his father, only for the commissioner to mock Shankar and his father beside not providing protection. Shankar gets a feeling that the police commissioner wants Sarkar to get murdered. Shankar and Khansaab, one of Sarkar's men, try to ask Mani for help to prevent possible murder, but Mani ultimately betrays them when he reveals that he is in an alliance with Rasheed. Rasheed prepares to kill Shankar and Khansaab, but only Khansaab is killed when he decides to sacrifice himself for Shankar. By the time Shankar reaches the prison and appropriate action is taken, the attempt on Sarkar's life is already made. Sarkar is later acquitted. He remains bedridden as Shankar takes on Sarkar's enemies.

Meanwhile, Mani, Swami, Vishram, and Rasheed try to convince Vishnu to murder Sarkar. Vishnu was previously expelled from Sarkar's house because he had murdered the actor who was having an affair with Sapna. Vishnu returns home pretending to have repented. When he approaches Sarkar in the dark of the night with the intent of murdering him, Shankar foils his plan and later kills him. Shankar eliminates Rasheed, Vishram, and Selvar Mani. He also succeeds in making Swami his puppet. Shankar has also realised that Chief Minister Madan Rathod was really behind everything; Rasheed and everyone else were merely pawns. This results in legal action against Rathod. The closing scenes show a woman approaching Shankar for justice to a fake encounter of her husband by the police and calling Shankar the Sarkar, while Subhash is busy with family.

Cast

 Amitabh Bachchan as Subhash Nagre (Sarkar)
 Abhishek Bachchan as Shankar Nagre
 Kay Kay Menon as Vishnu Nagre
 Supriya Pathak as Pushpa Nagre
 Katrina Kaif as Pooja Chauhan
 Tanisha Mukherjee as Avantika
 Rukhsaar Rehman as Amrita Nagre (Vishnu's wife)
 Anupam Kher as Motilal Khurana
 Kota Srinivasa Rao as Selvar Mani
 Zakir Hussain as Rashid
 Raju Mavani as Vishram Bhagat
 Jeeva as Virendra Swami
 Deepak Shirke as Madan Rathod
 Anant Jog as Police Commissioner
 Ishrat Ali as Khansaab
 Saurabh Dubey as Pooja's father
 Ravi Kale as Chander
 Virendra Saxena as Girl's father
 Carran Kapoor as a hero in Vishnu's film
 Nisha Kothari as a heroine in Vishnu's film
 Narendra Sachar as IG Police
 Mangal Kenkre as Shoba
 Shivam Shetty as Bhushan
 Chintan Atul Shah as Cheeku (Sarkar's Grandson / Shivaji Nagre in Sarkar 3)

Production

Development 
Sarkar's director Ram Gopal Varma was deeply influenced by the Francis Ford Coppola's Hollywood classic The Godfather (1972). He picked some aspects of story of The Godfather and added them to Sarkar's script, and also changed the film's setting to modern-day Mumbai.

Soundtrack 

The soundtrack of Sarkar consists of 10 songs composed by Bapi-Tutul & Prasanna Shekhar the lyrics of which were penned by Sandeep Nath.

Critical reception

Raja Sen of Rediff said that the film "had the potential to be great. It turns out to be passable." Taran Adarsh of Bollywood Hungama praised the movie saying that, "Sarkar is without doubt an interesting film. The story, its execution, the performances, the drama… The outcome leaves you spellbound." but criticized the slow pacing of the film and gave it a rating of 3.5 out of 5. William Thomas of Empire Online gave the film a rating of 4 out of 5 saying that, "Constructed with flair and crackling with intelligence, this is one of the most edgiest and grittiest releases to come out of Bollywood in years."

Abhishek Bachchan won multiple awards for his performance in the film, namely Filmfare Best Supporting Actor Award, Zee Cine Award Best Actor in a Supporting Role - Male, and IIFA Award for Best Supporting Actor.

Accolades

Remake
A Telugu remake, titled Rowdy was made replacing the background of Marathi politics with that of South Indian factionism. Veteran actor Mohan Babu reprised the role portrayed by Amitabh Bachchan while his son Vishnu Manchu reprised the role played by Abhishek Bachchan. Rowdy released on 4 April 2014 to positive reviews from critics but was a moderate commercial success, grossing approximately Rs 8 Crores in its full run.

Sequel
A sequel titled Sarkar Raj was released on 6 June 2008 with Amitabh Bachchan, Abhishek Bachchan (who reprise their roles from the original) and new entrant Aishwarya Rai Bachchan. Supriya Pathak, Tanisha Mukherjee and Ravi Kale also reappeared in their respective roles from Sarkar. The film released on 6 June 2008, was both critically and commercially successful.

See also 

 The Godfather (1972) by Francis Ford Coppola from which this Sarkar's story and lead characters are adapted and have similarities.

Notes

References

External links

 

Indian sequel films
Indian gangster films
Bal Thackeray
Indian crime thriller films
Indian crime drama films
Films set in Mumbai
Indian political thriller films
2005 crime drama films
2000s Hindi-language films
2005 crime thriller films
2005 films
Films scored by Amar Mohile
Films about dysfunctional families
Films about organised crime in India
Films directed by Ram Gopal Varma
Works based on The Godfather